The Ranger 26-2 is an American trailerable sailboat, that was designed by Gary Mull.

The Ranger 26-2 design is not related to the Ranger 26, which was designed by Mull in 1969.

Production
The boat was built by Ranger Yachts, in the United States from 1980 until 1982. Ranger Yaxcjhts was a division of Lear Siegler at that time. Only a small number of boats of the design were completed and it is now out of production.

Design
The Ranger 26-2 is a small recreational keelboat, built predominantly of fiberglass. It has a fractional sloop rig, an internally-mounted spade-type rudder and a lifting keel. It displaces  and carries  of lead ballast.

The boat has a PHRF racing average handicap of 186 with a high of 201 and low of 159.

See also
List of sailing boat types

References

Keelboats
1970s sailboat type designs
Sailing yachts
Trailer sailers
Sailboat type designs by Gary Mull
Sailboat types built by Ranger Yachts